Zeybekler is a village in Mezitli district of Mersin Province, Turkey. (Capital of Mezitli district is in Greater Mersin). It is close to Kocayer village to the north. But due to frequent landslips the village is planned to be relocated. The population of Zeybekler was 173  as of 2012. The village is known as a fruit (especially peach) producer.

References

Villages in Mezitli District